Micromesomma is a genus of spiders in the family Migidae. It was first described in 1895 by Pocock. , it contains only one species, Micromesomma cowani, found in Madagascar.

References

Migidae
Mygalomorphae genera
Monotypic Mygalomorphae genera
Spiders of Madagascar